José Manuel Estrada Calzada (born 12 March 1957), better known as Pipi Estrada, is a well-known Spanish sports journalist.

Biography 
His father worked at ENSIDESA, a Spanish steel producer. In his native Gijón, in Asturias, he knew Gaspar Rosety, a journalist who would become a great figure in his career path. He was the one who also gave Estrada the nickname "Pipi", in honour of the children's book character Pippi Longstocking.

Estrada moved to Madrid so his father could study industrial engineering and during his time in the capital, he combined his studies with working as a DJ. In 1975, he arrived at the Cerebro nightclub, an icon of La Movida Madrileña, at the end of the Calle de la Princesa and one of the in-fashion clubs in Madrid. After, he worked at the Piñas Club on the Avenida de Alberto Alcocer until he finished his university studies.

His father passed away when Estrada was 23 years old and this was when he first started to have a presence on the airwaves, on the broadcaster Radio 80. Rosety gave him a slot with the presenter José Maríá García on Antena 3 Radio; he worked with García from 1983 until 1994. It was around this time that he got to know the presenter Terelu Campos, with whom he later start a relationship and become a regular on chat shows and the like.

After Antena 3 Radio, in 2004 he joined COPE, where he was the presenter and director of El banquillo on Onda 6. In 2005, he joined Punto Radio for the programme El mirador del deporte ("The Sports Watcher"), with Josep Pedrerol and Joaquín Ramos Marcos. In 2009, he joined chat show Sálvame on Telecinco, but left after an argument with Jimmy Giménez-Arnau.

Between 2011 and 2016, he worked as a sports commentator for EsRadio, becoming in charge of Real Madrid broadcasts. He also became a consejero de amor ("love advisor") on the Telecinco dating show Mujeres y hombres y viceversa between 2009 and 2013, whilst also dabbling in other programmes on that network. He also worked on the programme El chiringuito de Jugones between 2014 and 2022, broadcast on Mega. In 2022, he returned to Sálvame, and also participated on the reality show Pesadilla en El Paraíso, the Spanish version of the Swedish format Farmen.

Broadcasting

Sources

Spanish television personalities
Spanish television presenters
1957 births
People from Asturias
People from Gijón (Asturian comarca)
Living people